Simonazzi is a surname. Notable people with the surname include:

 Agide Simonazzi (1896–1951), Italian sprinter
 André Simonazzi (born 1968), Swiss politician
 Antonio Simonazzi (1824–1908), Italian painter
 Francesco Simonazzi

Italian-language surnames
Patronymic surnames
Surnames from given names